The canton of Thouars is an administrative division of the Deux-Sèvres department, western France. It was created at the French canton reorganisation which came into effect in March 2015. Its seat is in Thouars.

It consists of the following communes:
Louzy
Sainte-Verge
Saint-Jacques-de-Thouars
Saint-Jean-de-Thouars
Thouars

References

Cantons of Deux-Sèvres